Chaudhry Saud Majeed (Punjabi) is a Pakistani politician who had been a member of Senate of Pakistan since May 2015. Previously he had been a Member of the National Assembly of Pakistan from 2008 to 2013.

Political career
He ran for the seat of the Provincial Assembly of the Punjab as a candidate of Pakistan Muslim League (J) from Constituency PP-276 (Bahawalpur-X) in 2002 Pakistani general election but was unsuccessful. He received 11,136 votes and lost the seat to Muhammad Afzal, a candidate of Pakistan Peoples Party (PPP).

He was elected to the National Assembly of Pakistan as a candidate for Pakistan Muslim League (N) (PML-N) for the Constituency NA-187 (Bahawalpur-V) in 2008 Pakistani general election. He received 77,860 votes and defeated Pervaiz Elahi. In the same election, he ran for the seat of the Provincial Assembly of the Punjab from Constituency PP-276 (Bahawalpur-X) as a candidate of PML-N but was unsuccessful. He received 29,040 votes and lost the seat to Muhammad Afzal, a candidate of Pakistan Muslim League (Q) (PML-Q).

He ran for the seat of the National Assembly as a candidate for PML-N for NA-187 (Bahawalpur-V) in 2013 Pakistani general election but was unsuccessful. He received 88,872 votes and lost the seat to Tariq Bashir Cheema. In the same election, he ran for the seat of the Provincial Assembly of the Punjab from Constituency PP-276 (Bahawalpur-X) as an independent candidate but was unsuccessful. He received 166 votes and lost the seat to Muhammad Afzal, a candidate of PML-Q.

He was elected to the Senate of Pakistan as candidate of PML-N in May 2015.

References

Living people
Pakistani senators (14th Parliament)
Pakistan Muslim League (N) politicians
Pakistani MNAs 2008–2013
Punjabi people
People from Bahawalpur District
Year of birth missing (living people)